The Pope-Hartford was one of the automobile marques of the Pope Manufacturing Company founded by Colonel Albert A. Pope, and was a manufacturer of Brass Era automobiles in Hartford between 1904 and 1914.

History
Introduced on the market for 1904, the first Pope-Hartford was a single-cylinder runabout.  A twin-cylinder followed in 1905, and a four-cylinder in 1906 A six-cylinder Pope-Hartford did not arrive until 1911.

A 1910 Pope-Hartford Forty won the free-for-all race in November of 1909 celebrating the 300th anniversary of the discovery of San Francisco Bay by Don Gaspar de Portola, and for 1911 Pope-Hartford made available a chain-drive Fiat chassis fitted with a Pope engine and marketed as the Fiat-Portola.

On August 10th, 1909 Colonel Albert A. Pope died and his brother George took over.  By 1914, Pope-Hartford production continued under receivership. Pope Manufacturing Company had been selling-off its property and the Pope-Hartford plant was sold in 1915.

Gallery

See also
 Pope-Hartfords at ConceptCarz

References

Companies established in 1876
Defunct motor vehicle manufacturers of the United States
Manufacturing companies based in Hartford, Connecticut
Defunct manufacturing companies based in Connecticut
Brass Era vehicles
1900s cars
1910s cars
Motor vehicle manufacturers based in Connecticut
Vehicle manufacturing companies established in 1904
Vehicle manufacturing companies disestablished in 1914
Cars introduced in 1904